Francis Bermingham, O.F.M., fl. 1652, was an Irish Franciscan friar and scholar.

Bermingham was a descendant of Meyler de Bermingham (1275), the founder of Athenry.

Popularly known as Franciscus a Galvia (Francis of Galway), he was born there early in the 17th century. Upon joining the Franciscan Order as a young man, he was sent abroad to be educated. He taught philosophy at Milan and in Rome was Jubilate lecturer in Divinity at the College of St. Isidore, as well as serving as Definitor General of his Order. He was named amongst those Franciscan friars banished from their convent at Galway in 1652.

See also

 Baron Athenry
 Basilia de Bermingham
 Second Battle of Athenry
 John de Bermingham, 1st Earl of Louth
 Thomas IV de Bermingham
 John Birmingham (astronomer)

Bibliography

 De Sanctissima Trinitate, Rome.

References

 History of Galway, James Hardiman, 1820.
 Galway Authors, Helen Mahar, 1976.

People from County Galway
Irish writers
Irish Friars Minor
17th-century Irish Roman Catholic priests
Franciscan scholars
Francis